The 2011–12 Illinois Piasa season was the sixth season of the Illinois Piasa indoor soccer club and second as a franchise in the Professional Arena Soccer League. The Piasa, named for the Piasa Bird of Native American legend, were an Eastern Division team who played this season's home games at The Sports Academy in Glen Carbon, Illinois. The team was led by co-head coaches Joe Reiniger and Justin McMillian.

Off-field moves
In September 2011, the Piasa signed a multi-year deal to make The Sports Academy the team's new home arena. That same month, the team hired both Joe Reiniger and Justin McMillian to serve as co-head coaches for the 2011–12 season. Reiniger played professionally for the St. Louis Ambush, Milwaukee Wave, and St. Louis Steamers, and was selected as the Most Valuable Player of the 2001 National Professional Soccer League Championship. McMillian's playing career included stops with the Indiana Blast, St. Louis Steamers, and St. Louis Illusion.

The team also announced that player Elvir Kafedžić would serve as assistant coach. Both he and co-head coach Justin McMillian remained on the active roster.

Before the team's final home game of the regular season on February 11, 2012, the Piasa honored St. Louis soccer legend Dragan "Don" Popović with a halftime ceremony. A native of Yugoslavia, Popović made his American professional debut with the St. Louis Stars in 1967. He was inducted into the St. Louis Soccer Hall of Fame in 2004 and member of the inaugural class by the Indoor Soccer Hall of Fame in October 2011.

Roster moves
Illinois Piasa conducted two open tryouts for new players in September 2011. The tryouts were held on their home turf at The Sports Academy in Glen Carbon, Illinois.

Schedule

Regular season

Post-season

References

External links
Illinois Piasa official website
The Sports Academy official website

Illinois Piasa seasons
Illinois Piasa
Illinois Piasa season
Illinois Piasa season